The DDD-1 (Dynamic Digital Drums) is a sampling drum machine introduced in 1986 by Korg. It offers more features than the DDD-5, and is highly regarded for its sounds and sequencer. The unit also features a limited sampling option, for adding sounds to the drum machine. It also has fully featured MIDI implementation, six assignable outputs, and a backlit LCD screen.

Sounds
Highly regarded for its sounds and sequencer, it features 18 on-board sounds, which include kicks, snares, toms, rimshot, closed hi-hats, open hi-hats, ride, crash, claps, cowbell, tambourine, and cabasa. Parameters, such as decay and tuning, can be edited. Additional sounds can be added using the four ROM expansion slots.

Its default sounds are based on the first sampling drum machine, the Wendel, which was built by Roger Nichols and can be heard on many of late ’70s and early ’80s hits. “Hey, Nineteen” by Steely Dan being a notable example.

Controls
Pitch, dynamics, decay, roll, and flam.

Sampling
The sample rates are: 13.6, 23.1 kHz. For a maximum time of 3.2 seconds the optional DSB-1 sampling board installed.

Options
 Pedal switch (PS-1, PS-2)
 Hard case
 Memory card ROM
 Memory card RAM
 Sampling board
 KH-100 Headphones

Sequencer
Sequencer patterns can be recorded in 2 modes
 Real-time with metronome (quantisizer resolution from 1/4 to 1/96) 
 Step mode

Notable Users

Official brochure
http://www.korgforums.com/support/brochure/DDD-1_1986_Brochure.pdf

Further reading
https://www.korg.com/us/support/download/manual/1/345/3700/

References

Drum machines